Cuyahoga Heights High School is a public high school located in Cuyahoga Heights, Ohio, United States. It serves the villages of Cuyahoga Heights, Valley View, and Brooklyn Heights. It is a Blue Ribbon School of Excellence.

Athletics

Ohio High School Athletic Association State Championships 

 Girls' softball - 2014

Mascot change
By unanimous vote of the Board of Education in August 2021, the outdated name "Redskins" was removed immediately. Until a new mascot was selected, the school was known as "Heights". On March 23, 2022 the new mascot was revealed and the school will go forward as the "Red Wolves".

Notable alumni
 Zac Lowther - baseball player for the Baltimore Orioles Organization 
 Jason Popson - musician, rapper, and vocalist for the band Mushroomhead
 Flip Saunders - NBA basketball player and coach
 Jack Squirek - former NFL linebacker
 Kelli Stack - a member of the United States women's national ice hockey silver medal team 
 Zach D'Orazio - former NFL wide receiver

Notes and references

External links
Cuyahoga Heights Schools
School Matters: Overview of Cuyahoga Heights Schools

High schools in Cuyahoga County, Ohio
Public high schools in Ohio